Theriosuchus is an extinct genus of atoposaurid neosuchian from Late Jurassic to Early Cretaceous of Europe (Hungary & southern England), Southeast Asia (Thailand) and western North America (Wyoming), with fragmentary records from Middle Jurassic and Early Cretaceous sites in China, Morocco, and Scotland.

Taxonomy
 
Three valid species are currently recognized: Theriosuchus pusillus from southern England, T. grandinaris from Thailand, and T. morrisonensis from the Morrison Formation of North America. Theriosuchus was previously assigned to Atoposauridae, but a 2016 cladistic analysis recovered it as a neosuchian more closely related to members of the family Paralligatoridae than to atoposaurids.

Two species previously assigned to this genus, Theriosuchus ibericus and T. symplesiodon, have been reassigned to the new genus Sabresuchus. On the other hand, Theriosuchus guimarotae from Portugal has been reassigned to Knoetschkesuchus.

References

Prehistoric reptiles of Asia
Early Cretaceous crocodylomorphs
Early Cretaceous reptiles of Europe
Fossil taxa described in 1879
Neosuchians
Prehistoric pseudosuchian genera